Andre du Toit (born 9 October 1952) is a South African cricketer. He played in 31 first-class and 6 List A matches for Boland from 1980/81 and 1986/87.

See also
 List of Boland representative cricketers

References

External links
 

1952 births
Living people
South African cricketers
Boland cricketers